The discography of South Korean singer-songwriter, rapper, record producer Yong Jun-hyung consists of one studio album, two extended plays, and seven singles.

Studio album

Extended play

Singles

As lead artist

Collaborations

As featured artist

Soundtrack appearances

Other charted songs

Music Videos

Notes

References 

Discographies of South Korean artists
Highlight (band)